Tân Lạc may refer to several places in Vietnam, including:

Tân Lạc District, a rural district of Hòa Bình Province
Tân Lạc, Nghệ An, a township and capital of Quỳ Châu District
Tân Lạc, Lâm Đồng, a commune of Bảo Lâm District, Lâm Đồng Province